"A Day Without Me" is a song by Irish rock band U2, and the eighth track on their debut album Boy. It was released as the album's lead single in August 1980, and was their first release to be produced by Steve Lillywhite.

Theme
The song's lyrics refer to the removal of someone from their habitual social circle, and reflecting on what the world would be like without their presence.

At the time of the single's release, an Island Records press officer was notifying enquirers who were corresponding with the record label about the band that the song's lyrics were written about the death of Ian Curtis, the frontman/vocalist of the band Joy Division. However, this information was erroneous as the band performed the song in Dublin in February 1980, musically and lyrically unaltered from its release format, a few months before Curtis's death.

Production
The single release was produced by Steve Lillywhite, and was the first time that he recorded with U2.

The B-side is an instrumental song called "Things to Make and Do."

Cover art
The image on the single's cover, photographed by Susan Byrne, is of a footbridge at Booterstown railway station in South Dublin. The image echoes the  Joy Division photoshoot on the Epping Walk Bridge in Hulme, Manchester, that featured in an article of New Musical Express in January 1979.

Live performances
"A Day Without Me" was played live during the first half of the 1980s. On the Boy Tour, it did not have a firmly defined set list position, initially appearing in the main set before moving to the encore. It did not appear on the October Tour until , when it was paired with "I Threw a Brick Through a Window", a song from the newly released October album. The two songs were linked by a drum segue leading from the end of "I Threw a Brick Through a Window" into "A Day Without Me", and this pairing lasted until . Since then, neither song has been played live, although snippets of "A Day Without Me" have been played on rare occasions. A live performance of the song from Red Rocks Amphitheatre appears on the concert film U2 Live at Red Rocks: Under a Blood Red Sky.

"Things to Make and Do" was the only instrumental played live by U2 until the U2 360° Tour ("Return of the Stingray Guitar"), and it regularly followed "The Electric Co." on the Boy Tour.

Track listing

References

External links
"A Day Without Me" Lyrics from U2.com

1980 singles
Joy Division
U2 songs
Columbia Records singles
Island Records singles
Songs about suicide
Songs written by Bono
Songs written by the Edge
Songs written by Adam Clayton
Songs written by Larry Mullen Jr.
Song recordings produced by Steve Lillywhite
1980 songs